Sceloporus cupreus, also known commonly as the upland long-tailed spiny lizard, is a species of lizard in the family Phrynosomatidae. The species is endemic to Mexico.

Etymology
The specific name, cupreus, meaning "coppery" in Latin, refers to the dorsal color of some males of this species. The junior synonym, S. cochranae, was named in honor of American herpetologist Doris Mable Cochran.

Geographic range
S. cupreus is found in the Mexican state of Oaxaca.

References

Further reading
Bocourt MF (1873). "Deux notes sur quelques sauriens de l'Amérique tropicale ". Annales des sciences naturelles, Cinquième serie [= Fifth Series ] 19 (4): 1–5. (Sceloporus cupreus, new species, p. 3). (in French).
Smith HM (1936). "Descriptions of New Species of Lizards of the Genus Sceloporus from Mexico". Proceedings of the Biological Society of Washington 49: 87–96. (Sceloporus cochranae, new species, pp. 87–89).
Smith HM, Taylor EH (1950). "An Annotated Checklist and Key to the Reptiles of Mexico Exclusive of the Snakes". Bulletin of the United States National Museum (199): 1–253. (Sceloporus siniferus cupreus, new combination, p. 134).

Sceloporus
Endemic reptiles of Mexico
Reptiles described in 1873
Taxa named by Marie Firmin Bocourt
Natural history of Oaxaca